Palwasha Bashir (born 20 October 1987) is a badminton player, born in Karachi, Pakistan. Bashir was crowned as the National Champion in 2009, winning the women's singles and doubles titles. Palwasha has been representing Pakistan for several years in different International competitions. Initially rising as a star on a national level by winning back-to-back national titles. She won the bronze medal at the 2010 South Asian Games held in Dhaka. This achievement led her to a greater fame and acknowledgement in Pakistan. Bashir has represented her country at the 2014 Asian Games, 2014 and 2018 Commonwealth Games. She has been coached by Raziuddin Ahmad.

Achievements

South Asian Games 
Women's singles

BWF International Challenge/Series (3 titles, 2 runners-up) 
Women's singles

Women's doubles

  BWF International Challenge tournament
  BWF International Series tournament
  BWF Future Series tournament

References

External links 
 Pakistan Badminton Federation homepage
Palwasha Bashir Instagram

1987 births
Living people
Racket sportspeople from Karachi
Pakistani female badminton players
Badminton players at the 2018 Commonwealth Games
Badminton players at the 2014 Commonwealth Games
Commonwealth Games competitors for Pakistan
Badminton players at the 2014 Asian Games
Asian Games competitors for Pakistan
South Asian Games bronze medalists for Pakistan
South Asian Games medalists in badminton